Microphysogobio alticorpus is a species of cyprinid fish endemic to Taiwan.

References

Microphysogobio
Fish described in 1968
Taxa named by Petre Mihai Bănărescu
Taxa named by Teodor T. Nalbant